Money Money may refer to:

 "Money Money" (RBD song)
 "Money, Money", a 2002 song by Bone Thugs-n-Harmony
 "Money Money", a 2021 song by Roxen, DMNDS and Strange Fruits
 "Money, Money", a song from the 1972 film Cabaret
 Money Money (film), a 1995 Telugu comedy film

See also
Money, Money, Money (disambiguation)